L'enfant Roi  is a 2009 short film.

Synopsis 
Once upon a time in Africa, a village called Nidiobina was ravaged by fire. Two of its inhabitants Foudi Mamaya and his wife are forced to leave their village in search of food leaving behind their only son, Bouba, in the care of his grandfather Wali. Wali teaches his grandson how to become a man, and Bouba becomes a gifted pupil.

Awards 
 Jornadas del Cine Europeo de Túnez 2008

External links 

2009 films
Tunisian short films